Munshiganj-3 is a constituency represented in the Jatiya Sangsad (National Parliament) of Bangladesh from 2018 by Mrinal Kanti Das of the Awami League.

Boundaries 
The constituency encompasses Munshiganj Sadar, and Gazaria upazilas.

Members of Parliament

References

External links
 

Parliamentary constituencies in Bangladesh